Diazonium compounds or diazonium salts are a group of organic compounds sharing a common functional group  where R can be any organic group, such as an alkyl or an aryl, and X is an inorganic or organic anion, such as a halide.

General properties and reactivity

Arenediazonium cations and related species
According to X-ray crystallography the  linkage is linear in typical diazonium salts. The  bond distance in benzenediazonium tetrafluoroborate is 1.083(3) Å, which is almost identical to that for dinitrogen molecule (N≡N).

The linear free energy constants σm and σp indicate that the diazonium group is strongly electron-withdrawing. Thus, the diazonio-substituted phenols and benzoic acids have greatly reduced pKa values compared to their unsubstituted counterparts. The pKa of phenolic proton of 4-hydroxybenzenediazonium is 3.4, versus 9.9 for phenol itself. In other words, the diazonium group lowers the pKa (enhances the acidity) by a million-fold.

The stability of arenediazonium salts is highly sensitive to the counterion. Phenyldiazonium chloride is dangerously explosive, but benzenediazonium tetrafluoroborate is easily handled on the bench. 

SN1 and SN2 reactions do not occur.

Arenediazonium salts are versatile reagents as described in the next sections After electrophilic aromatic substitution, diazonium chemistry is the most frequently applied strategy to prepare aromatic compounds.

Alkanediazonium cations and related species
Alkanediazonium salts are synthetically unimportant due to their extreme and uncontrolled reactivity toward SN2/SN1/E1 substitution. These cations are however of theoretical interest. Furthermore, methyldiazonium carboxylate is believed to be an intermediate in the methylation of carboxylic acids by diazomethane, a common transformation. 

, ΔH = −43 kcal/mol
, ΔH = −11 kcal/mol
For secondary and tertiary alkanediazonium species, the enthalpic change is calculated to be close to zero or negative, with minimal activation barrier. Hence, secondary and (especially) tertiary alkanediazonium species are either unbound, nonexistent species or, at best, extremely fleeting intermediates. 

The aqueous pKa of methanediazonium is estimated to be <10.

Preparation 
The process of forming diazonium compounds is called "diazotation", "diazoniation", or "diazotization". The reaction was first reported by Peter Griess in 1858, who subsequently discovered several reactions of this new class of compounds. Most commonly, diazonium salts are prepared by treatment of aromatic amines with nitrous acid and additional acid. Usually the nitrous acid is generated in situ (in the same flask) from sodium nitrite and the excess mineral acid (usually aqueous HCl, p-, or ):

Chloride salts of diazonium cation, traditionally prepared from the aniline, sodium nitrite, and hydrochloric acid, are unstable at room temperature and are classically prepared at 0 – 5 °C. However, one can isolate diazonium compounds as tetrafluoroborate or tosylate salts, which are stable solids at room temperature. It is often preferred that the diazonium salt remain in solution, but they do tend to supersaturate. Operators have been injured or even killed by an unexpected crystallization of the salt followed by its detonation.

Due to these hazards, diazonium compounds are often not isolated. Instead they are used in situ. This approach is illustrated in the preparation of an arenesulfonyl compound:

Diazo coupling reactions
The first use of diazonium salts was to produce water-fast dyed fabrics by immersing the fabric in an aqueous solution of the diazonium compound, followed by immersion in a solution of the coupler (the electron-rich ring that undergoes electrophilic substitution). The major applications of diazonium compounds remains in the dye and pigment industry.

The most widely practiced reaction of diazonium salts remains azo coupling, which is exploited in the production of azo dyes. In this process, the diazonium compound is attacked by, i.e., coupled to, electron-rich substrates. When the coupling partners are arenes such as anilines and phenols, the process is an example of electrophilic aromatic substitution:

Another commercially important class of coupling partners are acetoacetic amides, as illustrated by the preparation of Pigment Yellow 12, a diarylide pigment.

The resulting azo compounds are often useful dyes and in fact are called azo dyes. The deep colors of the dyes reflects their extended conjugation. For example, the dye called aniline yellow is produced by mixing aniline and cold solution of diazonium salt and then shaking it vigorously. Aniline yellow is obtained as a yellow solid. Similarly, a cold basic solution of Naphthalen-2-ol (beta-naphthol) give the intensely orange-red precipitate. Methyl orange is an example of an azo dye that is used in the laboratory as a pH indicator.

Displacement of the  group
Arenediazonium cations undergo several reactions in which the  group is replaced by another group or ion. Some of the major ones are the following.

Biaryl coupling
A pair of diazonium cations can be coupled to give biaryls. This conversion is illustrated by the coupling of the diazonium salt derived from anthranilic acid to give diphenic acid.

Replacement by halides

Sandmeyer reaction

Benzenediazonium chloride heated with cuprous chloride or cuprous bromide respectively dissolved in HCl or HBr yield chlorobenzene or bromobenzene, respectively.

Gattermann reaction
In the Gattermann reaction, benzenediazonium chloride is warmed with copper powder and HCl or HBr to produce chlorobenzene and bromobenzene respectively. It is named after the German chemist Ludwig Gattermann.

Replacement by iodide
Arenediazonium cations react with potassium iodide to give the aryl iodide:

Replacement by fluoride

Fluorobenzene is produced by thermal decomposition of benzenediazonium tetrafluoroborate. The conversion is called the Balz–Schiemann reaction.

The traditional Balz–Schiemann reaction has been the subject of many motivations, e.g. using hexafluorophosphate(V) and hexafluoroantimonate(V) in place of tetrafluoroborate. The diazotization can be effected with nitrosonium salts such as nitrosonium hexafluoroantimonate(V) .

Miscellaneous replacements

Replacement by hydrogen
Arenediazonium cations reduced by hypophosphorous acid, ethanol, sodium stannite or alkaline sodium thiosulphate gives benzene:

An alternative way suggested by Baeyer & Pfitzinger is to replace the diazo group with H is: first to convert it into hydrazine by treating with  then to oxidize it into hydrocarbon by boiling with cupric sulphate solution.

Replacement by a hydroxyl group
Phenols are produced by heating aqueous solutions of arenediazonium salts:

This reaction goes by the German name Phenolverkochung ("cooking down to yield phenols"). The phenol formed may react with the diazonium salt and hence the reaction is carried in the presence of an acid which suppresses this further reaction.

Replacement by a nitro group
Nitrobenzene can be obtained by treating benzenediazonium fluoroborate with sodium nitrite in presence of copper. Alternatively, the diazotisation of the aniline can be conducted in presence of cuprous oxide, which generates cuprous nitrite in situ:

Replacement by a cyano group
The cyano group usually cannot be introduced by nucleophilic substitution of haloarenes, but such compounds can be easily prepared from diazonium salts. Illustrative is the preparation of benzonitrile using the reagent cuprous cyanide:

This reaction is a special type of Sandmeyer reaction.

Replacement by a trifluoromethyl group 
Two research groups reported trifluoromethylations of diazonium salts in 2013. In contrast, Fu reported the trifluoromethylation using Umemoto's reagent (S-trifluoromethyldibenzothiophenium tetrafluoroborate) and Cu powder (Gattermann-type conditions). They can be described by the following equation:

The bracket indicates that other ligands on copper are likely present but are omitted.

Replacement by a thiol group

Diazonium salts can be converted to thiols in a two-step procedure. Treatment of benzenediazonium chloride with potassium ethylxanthate followed by hydrolysis of the intermediate xanthate ester gives thiophenol:

Replacement by an aryl group
The aryl group can be coupled to another using arenediazonium salts. For example, treatment of benzenediazonium chloride with benzene (an aromatic compound) in the presence of sodium hydroxide gives diphenyl:

This reaction is known as the Gomberg–Bachmann reaction. A similar conversion is also achieved by treating benzenediazonium chloride with ethanol and copper powder.

Replacement by boronate ester group 
A Bpin (pinacolatoboron) group, of use in Suzuki-Miyaura cross coupling reactions, can be installed by reaction of a diazonium salt with bis(pinacolato)diboron in the presence of benzoyl peroxide (2 mol %) as an initiator:. Alternatively similar borylation can be achieved using transition metal carbonyl complexes including dimanganese decacarbonyl.

Replacement by formyl group 
A formyl group, –CHO, can be introduced by treating the aryl diazonium salt with formaldoxime, followed by hydrolysis of the aryl aldoxime to give the aryl aldehyde. This reaction is known as the Beech reaction.

Other dediazotizations
 by organic reduction at an electrode
 by mild reducing agents such as ascorbic acid (vitamin C)
 by gamma radiation from solvated electrons generated in water
 photoinduced electron transfer
 reduction by metal cations, most commonly a cuprous salt.
 anion-induced dediazoniation: a counterion such as iodine gives electron transfer to the diazonium cation forming the aryl radical and an iodine radical
 solvent-induced dediazoniation with solvent serving as electron donor

Meerwein reaction
Benzenediazonium chloride reacts with compounds containing activated double bonds to produce phenylated products. The reaction is called the Meerwein arylation:

Metal complexes
For example, low-valent metal complexes add with diazonium salts.

Grafting reactions
In a potential application in nanotechnology, the diazonium salts 4-chlorobenzenediazonium tetrafluoroborate very efficiently functionalizes single wall nanotubes. In order to exfoliate the nanotubes, they are mixed with an ionic liquid in a mortar and pestle. The diazonium salt is added together with potassium carbonate, and after grinding the mixture at room temperature the surface of the nanotubes are covered with chlorophenyl groups with an efficiency of 1 in 44 carbon atoms. These added subsituents prevent the tubes from forming intimate bundles due to large cohesive forces between them, which is a recurring problem in nanotube technology.

It is also possible to functionalize silicon wafers with diazonium salts forming an aryl monolayer. In one study, the silicon surface is washed with ammonium hydrogen fluoride leaving it covered with silicon–hydrogen bonds (hydride passivation). The reaction of the surface with a solution of diazonium salt in acetonitrile for 2 hours in the dark is a spontaneous process through a free radical mechanism:

So far grafting of diazonium salts on metals has been accomplished on iron, cobalt, nickel, platinum, palladium, zinc, copper and gold surfaces. Also grafting to diamond surfaces has been reported. One interesting question raised is the actual positioning on the aryl group on the surface. An in silico study  demonstrates that in the period 4 elements from titanium to copper the binding energy decreases from left to right because the number of d-electrons increases. The metals to the left of iron are positioned tilted towards or flat on the surface favoring metal to carbon pi bond formation and those on the right of iron are positioned in an upright position, favoring metal to carbon sigma bond formation. This also explains why diazonium salt grafting thus far has been possible with those metals to right of iron in the periodic table.

Reduction to a hydrazine group
Diazonium salts can be reduced with stannous chloride to the corresponding hydrazine derivatives. This reaction is particularly useful in the Fischer indole synthesis of triptan compounds and indometacin. The use of sodium dithionite is an improvement over stannous chloride since it is a cheaper reducing agent with fewer environmental problems.

Biochemistry
Alkanediazonium ions, otherwise rarely encountered in organic chemistry, are implicated as the causative agents in the carcinogens. Specifically, nitrosamines are thought to undergo metabolic activation to produce alkanediazonium species.

Safety
Solid diazonium halides are often dangerously explosive, and fatalities and injuries have been reported.

The nature of the anions affects stability of the salt. Arenediazonium perchlorates, such as nitrobenzenediazonium perchlorate, have been used to initiate explosives.

See also 
 Diazo
 Diazo printing process
 Benzenediazonium chloride
 Triazene cleavage
 Dinitrogen complex

References

External links 
 

Organic compounds
Carbon-heteroatom bond forming reactions
Functional groups
Organonitrogen compounds